Eilera (born Aurélie Potin Suau) is a French musician, songwriter, guitarist and music producer. She is known for her idiosyncratic musical and vocal style within the Rock/Metal genre.

Biography

Eilera first started playing music at the age of twelve when she began taking classical guitar lessons. At the age of seventeen she moved on to the electric guitar and began playing metal music. At the age of nineteen she decided to form her own metal band but for some time was unsuccessful at recruiting members she could work with. It wasn't until she met members of the bands Hegemon, and Kalisia in Montpellier that she was able to put a working band together under the name of Suspiria.

Eventually, the name of the band was changed to Chrysalis, followed by the release of Between Strength and Frailty, a demo that was distributed by the French record label Adipocere Records. During this time Eilera and fellow Chrysalis guitarist Loïc Tézénas began working on a side project they called Bliss, which mixed electronic music with metal music. In 2003, Eilera along with Loïc decided to disband Chrysalis for various reasons and began to focus solely on their side project now known as Eilera. That same year the duo self-released Eilera's first album, a full-length demo titled Facettes.

In 2004, Eilera caught the attention of Finnish label Spinefarm Records and a recording contract was signed. In 2005, Eilera along with Loïc worked with record producer Hiili Hiilesmaa, cellist Max Lilja, drummer Antti Lehtinen, and other session musicians to record Eilera's first album under Spinefarm Records. The product, released that same year was an EP titled Precious Moment. In 2007, Eilera followed up her EP with her first studio album titled Fusion also recorded with the help of Hiili Hiilesmaa, Max Lilja, and Antti Lehtinen.

When Universal bought Spinefarm, her collaboration with the company ended and she started working independently. She self-released the album Darker Chapter… and stars. Some consider her online song selling method unique as she utilizes special aesthetics on her website.
After a tour in France, Eilera ended her collaboration with Loïc Tézénas and she moved to Finland, where she currently resides.

In Finland, Eilera worked on new collaborations, including one with Pariisin Kevät on their first album Meteoriitti, on which she wrote in French and composed for the track Alkemisti and recorded in Finnish on the track Pyykkipäivä.
She met Celtic harp player Lily Neill, with whom she practised in the buildings of the Sibelius Academy . Together with a cellist and the bass player Jan Sormo, they covered Eilera's songs and Tori Amos' song Winter.

After this acoustic break Eilera composed her new album.
The first 2 test-songs of this album were recorded at studio Finnvox in February–March together with Eilera's old friend Tero Kinnunen (Nightwish) and a band of new musicians.

Wishing for a more intimate approach, Eilera decided that the whole album would be recorded live in studio.

Five official videos were released in support of the album. Three of them were shot live in studio for the songs Angel Made Temptress, Deadly Together and Your Way. They were released to accompany the album publication. A lyric video for Face Your Demons followed, as well as a video for Male Female Balance. The latest was shot in Espoo, Finland.

All videos were shot by Eilera's old friend Mitja Harvilahti. The last two videos were part of a collaboration with Chilean visual artist David Letelier.

During the summer of 2017, Eilera announced that she would be working on a new record that would be acoustic-based, related to the themes of waves. 
In January 2019, it was announced that the album was complete, with a photograph taken from the Finnvox Studios in Helsinki. During the recording process, Eilera posted on Facebook that Waves is a Franco/Finnish/Chilean collaboration.

Discography

References

External links
 www.eilera.com – official website
 http://blog.eilera.com
 https://www.facebook.com/pages/Eilera/7099274934?ref=bookmarks

Women heavy metal singers
French women singers
French singer-songwriters
Living people
Musicians from Montpellier
Year of birth missing (living people)